The Duplex at 73-75 Sherman Street is a historic multiunit residential building in Burlington, Vermont.  Built about 1912 as a livery stable, it was adapted into a residential duplex in 1927. It is a good local example of vernacular Colonial Revival architecture, built as worker housing in the growing city.  It was listed on the National Register of Historic Places in 2013.

Description and history
Sherman Street is a short two-block street located on the west side of Burlington's Old North End neighborhood, a densely built residential area near the city's waterfront.  73-75 Sherman Street is a 2-1/2 story wood frame building on the south side of Sherman Street.  Unlike most of the street's buildings, it is set well back from the street, and shares a driveway with its neighbor to the left.  The building is basically rectangular in shape, with a gabled roof and clapboarded exterior.  The right three bays of the front facade are covered by a two-story porch with a shallow-pitch hip roof.  The porch's ground floor has an open front, and is supported by square posts, full-length at the center, and mounted on half-walls to the sides.  The second-floor porch roof is supported by round columns with Tuscan capitals, mounted on a half wall.

Lucius Bostwick was best known in the city as the owner of a drug store, which was located at Sherman and North Champlain Streets, a short way east of this location.  About 1912 he constructed this building to serve as a livery stable.  Due to rising demand for housing the neighborhood in the 1920s, he converted it into a two-unit apartment house.  A later owner, Joseph Veglia, used the property as an income-producing rental for a number of years, living in nearby housing on Sherman Street.  In his later years he occupied one of the units.

See also
National Register of Historic Places listings in Chittenden County, Vermont

References

Residential buildings on the National Register of Historic Places in Vermont
National Register of Historic Places in Chittenden County, Vermont
Residential buildings completed in 1888
Buildings and structures in Burlington, Vermont